Windber Area High School is a public High School on the Somerset-Cambria County Border, serving students from the Somerset County borough of Windber and Paint Borough in Cambria County. WAHS's feeder school, Windber Area Middle School is connected directly to the high school.

Athletics
Windber participates in the WestPac Conference and PIAA District VI
 Baseball – Class AA
 Basketball – Class A
 Cross Country – Class A
 Football – Class A
 Soccer – Class A
 Tennis – Class AA
 Track and Field – Class AA
 Volleyball – Class A

Activities
 Concert Choir
 Concert Band
 Competitive Marching Band
 Drama Club
 Spring Musical
 Technology Student Association
 Indoor Guard
 Indoor Majorettes
 Forensics
 Stage Crew
 World Languages Club
 History Club
 Ski Club
 Video Club
 Mock Trial
 Student Council
 National Honors Society
 Class Council
 SADD Club
 TATU Club
 FCA
 Windber News Team
 VEX Robotics
 Archery Club

References

Public high schools in Pennsylvania
Schools in Somerset County, Pennsylvania